UOW are the initials of the following universities:
University of Wah, Pakistan
University of Wales, United Kingdom
University of Warwick, United Kingdom
University of Westminster, United Kingdom
University of Winchester, United Kingdom
University of Wollongong, Australia
University of Wolverhampton, United Kingdom